Constantin Ritter von Isopescu-Grecul (or cavaler de Isopescu-Grecul; first name also Konstantin, last name also Isopescul-Grecul, Isopescu Grecu; ; February 2, 1871 – March 29, 1938) was an Austro-Hungarian-born Romanian jurist, politician, and journalist. He represented the region of Bukovina and a Romanian constituency in the Austrian House of Deputies continuously from 1907, participating in the political events of World War I. He was foremost known as a legal reformer and a political moderate, who objected to radical forms of Romanian nationalism and mainly sought to obtain a special status for the Romanians within a reformed Austria. His loyalism was rewarded by the Austrian authorities and antagonized the Romanian National People's Party, but Isopescu-Grecul also took distance from the pro-Austrian line advocated by Aurel Onciul. In 1908, Isopescu-Grecul joined Nicu Flondor and Teofil Simionovici in creating an Independent Party, which espoused a moderate program. He later rallied behind Iancu Flondor, embracing his conservative approach to national issues.

He was drawn closer to nationalism during the world war. He denounced the persecution of Romanians in Transylvania, and was disappointed by Austria's offer to merge Bukovina into a Ukrainian People's Republic. In late 1918, he still contemplated autonomy or independence for Bukovina and Transylvania, rather than union with the Kingdom of Romania, promoting Wilsonianism. When public order broke down in Vienna, he and Iuliu Maniu organized defense units of Romanians from the Common Army, which doubled as a police force. The process of union between Bukovina–Transylvania and Romania having been initiated, Isopescu-Grecul accepted the outcome. He continued to serve as Romanian envoy in Vienna and Prague for most of the Hungarian–Romanian War, when he favored forging a long-lasting alliance between Romania and the Hungarian conservative forces.

In 1920, Isopescu-Grecul made his way back to Bukovina, an adviser of the Romanian governments and an investor in forestry businesses. He made a return to politics eight years later, when he joined Maniu's National Peasants' Party and served briefly in the Chamber of Deputies. In 1930–1933, he held the office of rector of Czernowitz University, an institution which he also represented in the Senate of Romania.

Biography

Early life and career
Born into a noble ethnic Romanian family in Czernowitz (Cernăuți), his father Dimitrie was a high school principal and conservationist, and his paternal grandfather a Romanian Orthodox priest. Constantin's mother Aglaia Constantinovici-Grecul was the daughter of Ghideon Ritter von Grecul, who variously served as an archimandrite and as a high government official. Constantin had three siblings: Aurelia, a sister, who married the Austrian academic Johann Wenzel Patz; brothers Emanoil, Eusebie and Gheorghe—respectively, a professor, a physician, and a career soldier. Constantin alone was adopted by his maternal uncle, Temistocle Grecul, and therefore had a distinguishing compound surname.

Constantin attended school in his native city, then enrolling in Czernowitz University. Around 1892, he became a contributor to the Bukovinian–Romanian press, with articles in Încercări Literare, and later in Gazeta Bucovinei. These he signed as Constantin Verdi, or just Verdi. Also under this signature, he published his first and only poetry pieces. Having received a law doctorate in 1897, he entered the magistracy, serving as court clerk in Gura Humorului for a time before becoming a prosecutor in Czernowitz. From 1905, he was assistant professor of criminal law at his alma mater, rising to full professor in 1909. He married in 1897, and had a son and a daughter.

Also in 1897, Isopescu-Grecul made his debut in politics, as one of the founding members of the Bukovina National Romanian Party, centered on Iancu Flondor and Concordia Society. His journalistic work saw print in virtually every newspaper and magazine in Czernowitz, but also in Romanian publications in other parts of Austria-Hungary (Tribuna, Vatra) and in the Kingdom of Romania (Convorbiri Literare, Neamul Românesc). The latter were sometimes signed as Un român bucovinean ("A Bukovinian Romanian"). His scholarly works focused on attempts to regulate predatory lending, which was a main topic of legal and economic concern in his region. He published his work on "usury" and the Austrian penal code in 1906.

Before his death from heart disease in May 1901, Dimitrie had served as a Duchy of Bukovina representative in the Austrian House of Deputies. He was affiliated with the Conservative (or "Pactist") Party, headed by Ioan Volcinschi. A member of the breakaway Romanian National People's Party (PNPR) in its new avatar, the Apărărist group, Constantin took over for his father, and ran in the House at the Austrian election of 1907 for Czernowitz, Storozynetz and Bojan. He won his first of several terms, in a career which would see him elected as vice president of the House. Isopescu-Grecul was perceived as one of Austria's most loyal Romanian subjects, founding the Independent Party, together with Nicu Flondor and Teofil Simionovici. This group emerged in October 1908, when Dorimedont Popovici expelled Isopescu-Grecul from the PNPR, accusing him of opposing a reunification with the Democratic Peasants' Party. He himself rejected that claim, and accused Popovici of mounting a "diversion".

Subsequently, the Independents occupied the middle ground between two irreconcilable approaches: the radicalized nationalism of the PNPR and Concordia, and the loyalism of the Democratic Peasantists; the new party failed to survive for long, even though Isopescu-Grecul resisted any attempt at reconciliation with Concordia, and refused to hand in his resignation from the House. For much of his subsequent career, he was president of the House's four-member Romanian deputies' group in Vienna, and in 1909 co-founded a parliamentary "Latin Union"—with Aurel Onciul, Alexandru Hurmuzaki, and various Italian deputies. Also that year, he briefly returned into the conservative wing of the old Concordia, which still existed under Iancu Flondor.

In 1911, when all the Romanian factions briefly cooperated to block out other ethnic communities, Isopescu-Grecul also secured election to the Diet of Bukovina for Storozynetz. He had reconciled with Popovici and the PNPR youth wing, becoming one of the group's 7 representatives in the Diet; the Democratic Peasantists had 8, and the Conservatives, heralded by Iancu Flondor, had 5. He also retook his seat in the House in the parliamentary election of that year, again as representative for Storozynetz, Bojan, and Czernowitz. In Bojan, he defeated Florea Lupu, the Democratic Peasantist banker, during a heated campaign which saw him being injured by Lupu's voters. Isopescu-Grecul was putting out the newspaper Unirea Națională, which claimed that Lupu intended to destroy the network of Bukovinian Romanian banks.

World War I
With his background in law, Isopescu-Grecul spent much time reforming the antiquated military penal code, and helped write a new one. In 1911, he was bestowed the rank of adviser to Emperor Francis Joseph, and made a commander of the Order of Franz Joseph in September 1912. However, at home he was criticized for supporting the bill on conscription. This law gave Hungarian Transleithania increased control over much of the Austro-Hungarian Army, and, as such, harmed the agenda of Transleithanian Romanians.

Elevated into Austrian nobility in June of the following year, Isopescu-Grecul was sent on a diplomatic tour of Romania, alongside Mihail Chisanovici. This was a mission prepared by Count Leopold Berchtold, the Minister President of Austria, who wanted to calm the anti-Austrian irredentism of Romanian nationalists such as Nicolae Iorga. Upon the end of the First Balkan War, Isopescu-Grecul used his contacts in Romania to promote a favorite cause: statehood for the Aromanians. Already in 1912, he had backed Dervish Hima and Andrei Balamace, who petitioned internationally for an Independent Albania with Aromanian national representation. He proposed that Romania and the Central Powers could together offer the best guarantees for the Aromanians, promoting "Romanianism" against the ambitions of Greece and Serbia.

Isopescu-Grecul maintained his support for the status-quo during the early stages of World War I, while Romania remained neutral but hostile toward Austria. He openly disapproved of Bukovinians who considered union with Romania. He also deplored the growth of anti-Austrian sentiment in Romania-proper, insisting that it was being stoked by the Russian Empire. In November 1914, a reserve Unterleutnant in the Austro-Hungarian Army, he was promoted to Oberleutnant-Auditor by the emperor himself.

During 1916–1917, with Romania having joined the war on Austria-Hungary, the authorities clamped down on displays of nationalism—particularly so in Hungarian Transleithania. In his addresses in the House, Isopescu-Grecul claimed that some 6,000 Romanians had been interned as suspects, and suggested their release. The Hungarian government of István Tisza ordered the arrest of 16 Romanian nationalist leaders, 9 of whom were sentenced to death in a subsequent trial. Isopescu-Grecul took up their cause in the Viennese parliament, earning support from prominent figures such as Karl Seitz and Ignaz Seipel; they pleaded with Francis Joseph, arranging the prisoners' pardon and release.

During those months, the movements for ethnic and regional autonomy began competing with each other over Bukovina and Galicia–Lodomeria. At Czernowitz, the Bukovina Germans proclaimed regional autonomy, a move which perplexed the Romanians. Isopescu-Grecul and his fellow deputy Simionovici requested an interview with Ernest von Koerber, the new Minister President, who praised their loyalism and assured them that Bukovina would remain in the Austrian domain. In 1918, with the collapse of Austria-Hungary in sight, he became more closely involved with Romanian nationalism, taking his distance from Democratic Peasantists such as Aurel Onciul. He also disapproved of Austrian plans to transfer part of Bukovina to the Ukrainian People's Republic. Isopescu-Grecul publicly stated being for the preservation of "non-dismembered Bukovina"; secretly, his party prepared for ceding Schipenitz and other northern areas to the Ukrainian state, but demanded that the rest be preserved as a Romanian homeland. Politically, Isopescu-Grecul moved back into Flondor's wing of the Concordia movement, and for a while served as nominal president of Flondor's National Party.

The Treaty of Brest-Litovsk put an end to the war on the Russian Front, and returned the Austrian administration to Czernowitz. As skirmishes continued between Austro-Hungarian and Romanian armies during summer 1918, Isopescu-Grecul congratulated Emperor Charles on restoring Austrian Bukovina. However, in September, he and Simionovici informed Baron Hussarek, the Minister President, that Bukovinian Romanians felt betrayed by the regime, and no longer considered themselves loyal to the monarchy. On October 4, during an interview with the emperor, he asserted that the 4 million Romanians of Bukovina and Transylvania now wished to form their own independent state, or a single autonomous unit of Austria. While mentioned in some reports as supportive of a Danubian Federation, which had been proposed by Woodrow Wilson, he described it in his speeches as no longer feasible or desirable.

On October 16, Isopescu-Grecul became head of the Romanian National Council in Vienna, which regarded itself as a constitutional assembly for Transylvania–Bukovina. It was a five-member body: the four House deputies caucusing as Romanians, joined by George Grigorovici of the Bukovina Socialists. On the same day, Emperor Charles released his proclamation To my peoples, which promised a new political system for Cisleithania, but made virtually no mention of Bukovina's future organization.

Vienna crisis and Hungarian War
Isopescu-Grecul obtained that the House session of October 22 be assigned to presenting the Romanian Bukovinian viewpoint. In his own speech, he referred to the Fourteen Points doctrine as a guarantee of self-determination, criticizing the emperor's "nebulous" promises; he also attacked Austria for not intervening to support the Romanian cause in Transylvania or Transleithania at large. Rejecting any offer of partition, as had most non-Ukrainian deputies for Bukovina, he declared that he looked forward to the subject being tackled at the peace conference. He then led the Romanian deputies into a rendition of Deșteaptă-te, române!, the Romanian patriotic hymn. By November 1, the empire was descending into anarchy, and German speakers in Vienna demanded a German republic of their own. As Isopescu-Grecul put it: "we expected absolute change, if not perhaps the dissolution of Austria, within three months".

Isopescu-Grecul received in Vienna the Transylvanian Iuliu Maniu, of the more powerful Romanian National Party (PNR). Maniu, Isopescu-Grecul and Simionovici formed the triumvirate leadership of the reorganized Romanian Council; Viorel Tilea and Epifane Munteanu were appointed as their secretaries. On November 1, Isopescu and Maniu visited General Stöger-Steiner, nominally in charge of the War Ministry, and demanded direct control over Romanian units in the Common Army. Stöger yielded within the hour, although he admitted that he no longer controlled the troops, which answered to a revolutionary committee. With this, the Romanian Military Senate took charge of public order in Vienna, reorganizing troops on national grounds and under a Romanian flag. According to Tilea, the Senate was able to defend the War Ministry against armed assaults by groups answering to the Communist Party.

On November 25, Isopescu-Grecul traveled to Prague on a mission from the council, tasked with opening up relations between Romania and newly independent Czechoslovakia. A while after, the Council dissolved itself, and its members had placed themselves at the disposal of a similarly named committee in Czernowitz, which openly campaigned for union with Romania. Isopescu-Grecul himself was elected as one of the committee's 50 members, overseeing the incorporation of Bukovina into Greater Romania. On December 1, day of the "Great Union" in which Transylvanian Romanians declared their own union with Romania, he stated his "unconditional adherence" to the unionist proclamation.

In early 1919 he represented both Bukovina and Transylvania in Vienna, with the title of Commissioner for King Ferdinand I, as well as being, from February 8, Romania's first ambassador to Czechoslovakia. Simultaneously, he was head of a liquidation committee tasked with addressing litigious issues between Romania on one hand and, on the other, Republican Austria and the White Government of Hungary. Assisted by General Ioan Boeriu, he also formally dissolved the Military Senate of Vienna.

In his new capacity, Isopescu-Grecul favored an understanding with Hungarian conservatives during the War of 1919, in which Romania defeated the Hungarian Soviet Republic. In his indirect contacts with József Somssich, the conservative Minister of Foreign Affairs, he proposed a détente, noting that both their countries were threatened by Slavic encroachment. Reportedly, he described the Romanian military's conduct in Hungary as "most regrettable", and complained to his own co-nationals about the style of Romanian administration in the new regions. He also circulated rumors about a possible Hungarian–Romanian federation, as proposed to him by Hungarian landowners.

In June 1919, Isopescu-Grecul noted with worry that the Hungarians were losing interest in forming a league with Romania, and were instead pondering a personal union with the Kingdom of Yugoslavia, under Alexander Karađorđević. In August, as that project came to a halt, he expressed his support for a customs union and "tight alliance" between Hungary and Romania, arguing that the two countries formed an "economic whole". Hungarian diplomatic records of the time also suggest that Isopescu-Grecul vetoed Romania's alliance with Czechoslovakia and Austria against a restored Hungarian Kingdom, because "Rumania prefers a conservative rather than a socialist government in her rear." He also agreed to allow Hungary to rearm herself and join the Allied cause against Bolshevist Russia, and promised to help restore communications between Hungary and Transylvania.

Greater Romanian politics
Isopescu-Grecul's mission came to an end in September 1920, when Hungary and Romania exchanged ambassadors: he arranged for Szilárd Masirevich to be recognized as the Hungarian envoy to Romania, before being himself relieved by Ambassador Traian Stârcea. In December, he began working as an adviser for the Romanian Ministry of Agriculture and Royal Domains, under Dimitrie A. Grecianu. He continued to serve as head of the liquidation committee until 1922. During the same time, he also became involved with the Bukovina wood industry, a founder (in late 1920) and Chairman of the eponymous S.A. corporation Industria Silvică din Bucovina. By 1923, he was resuming his collaboration with Maniu, hoping to draw him and the PNR into an alliance with Flondor. Their politics was aimed against the centralizing National Liberal Party and its Bukovinian allies, the Democratic Unionists.

Isopescu-Grecul finally entered national politics in the general election of 1928, joining Maniu's National Peasants' Party (PNȚ), at the time a leading opposition party. He was vice president of the PNȚ chapter in Bukovina, and the host of its national congress in Alba Iulia (May 1928). He won a seat in the Chamber of Deputies after the party's landslide victory, one of four taken by the PNȚ in Cernăuți County—a list headed by Teofil Sauciuc-Săveanu. In this capacity, he advised the new Ministry of Transport on the supervision of the private railways. In November 1929, he was made a Commander of the Order of Pope Pius IX by the Holy See.

From 1930 to 1933, Isopescu-Grecul was rector of Cernăuți University, and, from May 1931, obtained the university's assigned seat in the Senate of Romania. His institution hit by the Great Depression, he formally demanded financial assistance for "Bukovina's brain and heart" from the government, led at the time his former rival, Nicolae Iorga. He then withdrew into academic work and contributed essays on legal topics, most of which only remained known to the community of specialists. The Romanian administration of Czernowitz/Cernăuți named a street in his honor, which proved to be the topic of controversy. The Review Committee vetoed the matter, noting that the rector was still alive, and therefore that his contemporaries were not able to assess his merits "in full competence".

In his late years, Isopescu-Grecul was also involved in intrigues between the Rusyn and Ukrainian communities, supporting Kassian Bogatyrets and Jevhen Kozak as the authorized representatives of the former. In April 1935, rumors circulated that he had left the PNȚ and joined the far-right Romanian Front; he denied that claim and rejected the Front's economic antisemitism, insisting that he considered Romanian Jews to be patriotic, and that their status as Romanian citizens was "crucial to me". He also described himself as "a simple soldier, not even an orderly of the National Peasants' Party, and therefore accustomed to discipline." At the time, his idea of unifying Romania and Hungary was again being championed by the likes of István Bethlen and Hermann Müller, who proposed it to Carol II; on the Romanian side, the negotiations reportedly involved Dimitrie Ghyka.

Isopescu-Grecul died in his native city in early 1938. One of his final assignments was as a delegate of the Romanian academic body in the Kingdom of Italy. In an obituary piece that was published in April, Iorga recognized Isopescu-Grecul as a "good Romanian" and a "stolidly impartial" legislator, an exponent of "correct Austrian bureaucratism". In contrast, Constantin Argetoianu, Iorga's one-time partner in government, dismissed Isopescu-Grecul in his memoirs, calling him "a disagreeable con artist". According to the left-wing lawyer Otto Roth, by 1939 the project for a personal union between Hungary and Romania was again being promoted by Budapest dissidents, being seen as a possible bulwark against encroachment by Nazi Germany.

Notes

References
Analele Bucovinei, Vol. VIII, Part 2, 2001. See:
Petru Bejinariu, "Dimitrie C. Isopescu — profesor și manager al învățământului", pp. 247–248.
Mircea Grigoroviță, "Pedagogi din Bucovina", pp. 303–318.
Teodor Bălan, Bucovina în războiul mondial. Cernăuți: Institutul de Arte Grafice și Editură Glasul Bucovinei, 1929.
Vasile Bianu, Insemnări din răsboiul României Mari. Tomul II: Dela mobilizare până la pacea din București. Cluj: Institutul de Arte Grafice Ardealul, 1926.
Mihai-Ștefan Ceaușu, "Die historische Entwicklung der rumänischen politischen Parteien in der Bukowina und ihre bedeutendsten Vertreter im Reichsrat und Landtag (1861–1914)", in Codrul Cosminului, Vol. XVII, Issue 2, 2011, pp. 93–108.
Cezar Ciorteanu, "Politico-territorial Projects Concerning Bukovina and the Romanian–Polish Border in the Context of Diplomatic Negotiations during and after World War I (1914–1920)", in Codrul Cosminului, Vol. XX, Issue 1, 2014, pp. 113–148.
Ioan Cocuz, Partidele politice românești din Bucovina, 1862–1914. Suceava: Cuvântul Nostru, 2003.  
Augustin Deac, Ion Spălățelu, "Prăbușirea imperiului austro-ungar și formarea statelor naționale unitare din centrul și sud-estul Europei", in Revista de Istorie, Nr. 3/1979, pp. 449–480.
François Deák, Dezső de Ujváry (eds.), Papers and Documents Relating to the Foreign Relations of Hungary. Volume 1: 1919–1920. Budapest: Royal Hungarian Ministry for Foreign Affairs, 1939.  
En., "Scrisori din Bucovina. Alegeri", in Viața Romînească, Issue 4, April 1911, pp. 133–142.
Vlad Gafița, "Puncte comune și contradicții între partidele politice românești din Bucovina (1911–1914)", in Codrul Cosminului, Issue 12, 2006, pp. 117–122.
Constantin Graur, Cu privire la Franz Ferdinand. Bucharest: Adevĕrul, 1935.  
Mihai-Octavian Groza, "Drumul spre Alba-Iulia trece prin Viena. Activitatea Senatului Militar Român Central al Ofițerilor și Soldaților din Viena (31 octombrie – 27 noiembrie 1918)", in Doru Sinaci, Emil Arbonie (eds.), Administrație românească arădeană. Studii și comunicări. Vol. 10: Studii și comunicări din Banat–Crișana, pp. 163–179. Arad: Vasile Goldiș University Press, 2015.  
Dorin Matei, "Viorel V. Tilea – trimis extraordinar. Cum s-a creat România Mare", in Magazin Istoric, February 2000, pp. 11–15, 57.

1871 births
1938 deaths
Politicians from Chernivtsi
People from the Duchy of Bukovina
Austrian nobility
Romanian nobility
Members of the Romanian Orthodox Church
Ethnic Romanian politicians in Bukovina
National Peasants' Party politicians
Members of the House of Deputies (Austria)
Members of the Chamber of Deputies (Romania)
Members of the Senate of Romania
Austrian jurists
Romanian jurists
Austrian civil servants
Romanian civil servants
Austrian diplomats
Romanian diplomats
19th-century Austrian poets
19th-century Romanian poets
Austrian male poets
Romanian male poets
Romanian columnists
Austrian newspaper founders
Austrian newspaper editors
Romanian newspaper founders
Romanian newspaper editors
Romanian industrialists
Romanian businesspeople in timber
Chernivtsi University alumni
Academic staff of Chernivtsi University
Rectors of King Carol I University
Austro-Hungarian military personnel of World War I
Austro-Hungarian Army officers
Romanian people of World War I
Romanian people of the Hungarian–Romanian War
Commanders of the Order of Franz Joseph
Knights Commander with Star of the Order of Pope Pius IX